Cholewiana Góra  is a village in the administrative district of Gmina Jeżowe, within Nisko County, Subcarpathian Voivodeship, in south-eastern Poland.

References

Villages in Nisko County